Events in the year 1846 in India.

Events
 1st Sikh War, 1845–46.
 March 9 - the Treaty of Lahore was a peace treaty marking the end of the First Anglo-Sikh War.
 March 16, Treaty of Amritsar (1846) ,formalised the arrangements in the Treaty of Lahore between the British East India Company and Gulab Singh Dogra after the First Anglo-Sikh War.

Law
Legal Practitioners Act

References

 
India
Years of the 19th century in India